The Fort is a 2010 historical novel written by Bernard Cornwell which relates to the events of the Penobscot Expedition of 1779 during the American Revolutionary War. The novel centers on the efforts of the British to establish and hold the fort against superior numbers of American patriots, and it contrasts the actions of John Moore and Paul Revere. Moore later laid the foundations of the light infantry doctrine used by the 95th Rifles and others against the French in the Revolutionary and Napoleonic wars. The novel also discusses the major loss and misjudgement by the Americans and how the British took advantage of it.

Publication
The book was released on 30 September 2010 in the United Kingdom.

References

2010 British novels
Novels by Bernard Cornwell
Novels set during the American Revolutionary War
Fiction set in 1779
Novels set in Maine
Hancock County, Maine
HarperCollins books
Novels set in the 1770s